Mount Franklin is a peak in the Nelson Lakes National Park in the Tasman Region of New Zealand.
It is the highest peak in the Tasman Region, just two metres higher than the nearby Mount Travers.

Mount Franklin is part of the Franklin Ridge, the northern extremity of the St James Range. The ridge separates the valleys of the east and west branches of the Sabine River.

The mountain was named by Sir Julius von Haast while he was provincial geologist of Canterbury. It is named in honour of Rear-Admiral Sir John Franklin, the British Arctic Explorer and former Governor of Tasmania.

Notes
Some sources give the elevation as

References

Frank